Blue Spirits is an album by trumpeter Freddie Hubbard released on the Blue Note label. It would be his last studio album for Blue Note, recorded in the 1960s. It features performances by Hubbard, James Spaulding, Joe Henderson, Harold Mabern, Jr., Larry Ridley, Clifford Jarvis, Big Black, Kiane Zawadi, Hank Mobley, McCoy Tyner, Bob Cranshaw, Pete LaRoca. The CD release added tracks from a 1966 session featuring Hosea Taylor, Herbie Hancock, Reggie Workman, and Elvin Jones.

Reception

Allmusic reviewer Scott Yanow stated: "The set is  seven diverse Hubbard originals and, even though none of the songs caught on to become standards, the music is quite challenging and fairly memorable." As stated in the liner notes, "The use of a fourth horn for this album, coupled with an exclusive focus on Hubbard's compositions, really threw light on the trumpeter's command of harmony, which is such a critical part of both his improvising and writing personality". Hubbard's playing here is among his best, and this album "is arguably the best recorded example of the Hubbard/James Spaulding partnership" which had been ongoing for the previous two years.

Track listing
All compositions by Freddie Hubbard
 "Soul Surge" - 10:24
 "Blue Spirits" - 12:14
 "Outer Forces" - 9:35
 "Cunga Black" - 5:15
 "Jodo" - 7:07
 "The Melting Pot" - 7:36 Bonus track on CD
 "True Colors" - 9:53 Bonus track on CD

Recorded on February 19, 1965 (#1, 4), February 26, 1965 (#2, 3, 5) and March 5, 1966 (#6-7).

Personnel
Tracks 1, 4
Freddie Hubbard - trumpet
James Spaulding - alto saxophone (1), flute (4).
Joe Henderson - tenor saxophone
Harold Mabern - piano
Larry Ridley - bass
Clifford Jarvis - drums
Big Black - congas
Kiane Zawadi - euphonium

Tracks 2, 3, 5
Freddie Hubbard - trumpet
Hank Mobley - tenor saxophone
James Spaulding - alto saxophone (3 & 5), flute (2).
McCoy Tyner - piano
Bob Cranshaw - bass
Pete LaRoca - drums
Kiane Zawadi - euphonium

Tracks 6-7
Freddie Hubbard - trumpet
Joe Henderson - tenor saxophone
Hosea Taylor - alto saxophone (6), bassoon (7).
Herbie Hancock - piano (6), harpsichord (7).
Reggie Workman - bass
Elvin Jones - drums

Notes
On the CD reissue of Blue Spirits, track 7 is listed as Hancock performing on the celeste, although it sounds like a harpsichord.

References

1967 albums
Freddie Hubbard albums
Blue Note Records albums
Albums produced by Alfred Lion
Albums recorded at Van Gelder Studio